Music for the Masses is the sixth studio album by English electronic music band Depeche Mode, released on 28 September 1987 by Mute Records. The album was supported by the Music for the Masses Tour, which launched their fame in the US when they performed at the Rose Bowl in Pasadena. The tour led to the creation and filming of the documentary/live album titled 101. This saw the band using heavy amounts of sampling, much like they did in their previous album Black Celebration.

Considered one of the band's best albums, Music for the Masses was included in the book 1001 Albums You Must Hear Before You Die.

Background
Daniel Miller, who had co-produced Depeche Mode's previous album, voluntarily stepped away from production duties for this album, citing the growing tension in the studio that they had experienced during the recording of Black Celebration. With Miller's approval, the band co-produced the album with David Bascombe, who had previously worked as a recording engineer with Tears for Fears and Peter Gabriel.

Band members Andy Fletcher and Martin Gore both explained the album's title was conceived as a joke. Fletcher said, "The title's ... a bit tongue-in-cheek, really. Everyone is telling us we should make more commercial music, so that's the reason we chose that title." According to Gore, the title "was a joke on the uncommerciality of [the album]. It was anything but music for the masses!"

Cover art
The megaphone (or its iconic representation) on the album's cover was used during the breadth of the album's release: at press events, on the covers of the album's singles, and during the tour. Alan Wilder gave credit to Martyn Atkins, who had been a longtime Depeche Mode collaborator, for the use of the megaphone. "[Martyn came] up with this idea of a speaker, but, to give the kind of ironic element which the title has, to put this speaker in a setting which wasn't really to do with the masses at all. It was, in fact, the opposite. So you end up with this kind of eerie thing where you get these speakers or megaphones in the middle of a setting that doesn't suit it at all, like a desert or whatever." The deserted natural setting in question was the Peak District.

An early alternative cover was rejected for the album. The rejected cover was also designed by Atkins and a test pressing copy was auctioned off by Wilder in 2011. It features a white-and-orange stylised design of the megaphone emitting sound waves. This alternate artwork was planned to be used for a budget series of albums, but the project was scrapped.

Re-release
In 2006, Music for the Masses became one of the first Depeche Mode albums (along with Speak & Spell and Violator) to be released on a special two-disc SACD/CD Hybrid + DVD format, in the vein of their 2005 album Playing the Angel, which had a limited edition SACD + DVD release. The format was the same as Playing the Angels, the first disc had a special digitally remastered version of the album, while the DVD had the album on three formats (PCM Stereo, 5.1 surround sound and DTS 5.1) plus bonus tracks, and a documentary on the album. The re-release preserves the album as it was originally intended. Thus, the four bonus tracks do not appear on the SACD, but appear on the DVD. The DVD also features all B-sides from the Music for the Masses era, but unlike the album and the bonus tracks, the B-sides are only available in PCM Stereo.

The documentary, a 37-minute short film titled Depeche Mode: 1987–88 (Sometimes You Do Need Some New Jokes), is an extensive look at the album, featuring commentary from a wide variety of people, including the current Depeche Mode, former member Wilder, producer David Bascombe, Daniel Miller, Daryl Bamonte, Atkins (who came up with the loudspeakers idea for the cover), Anton Corbijn, and others. The documentary features new facts on the album, and also an extensive look at the film 101.

The re-release was released on 3 April 2006 in Europe. The US version was delayed to 2 June 2006 and is only available on a CD + DVD format, with no SACD. The DVD on all the versions are region independent, but differ in television formats: PAL or NTSC. The remastered album was released on vinyl on 2 March 2007 in Germany and 5 March 2007 internationally.

Critical reception

The album mostly received favourable reviews upon release. Robert Christgau complimented the abnormal road symbolism of the lyrics, particularly on "Little 15", and believed that apart from the sadomasochistic metaphors, Depeche Mode succeeded in turning "adolescent Weltschmerz into something catchy, sexy and seemingly significant". NME Jane Solanas felt Gore was "at his obsessive best" on Music for the Masses, particularly on "Never Let Me Down Again", which she called "an intriguing masterpiece, combining homo-eroticism with drug euphoria." In a less enthusiastic review, Paul Mathur from Melody Maker was ambivalent towards the group's more mature, minimalist aesthetic and said although they had departed from their simpler pop sound, the record was "seamless, fluid, and, once the lights are out, particularly dull."

In a retrospective review, Q magazine found the narratives on Music for the Masses to be among Depeche Mode's most uncertain and contemplative, and that most of its songs were "real diamonds in the darkness ... this was the point at which Depeche Mode were first taken seriously." Slant Magazines Sal Cinquemani said that Music for the Masses showed the gloomier side of the "post-punk synthpop" scene during the 1980s and was a success with both critics and consumers. Alternative Press called the record "articulate, intricate electronic music that lacked the tinny feel of DM's early synth pop". Music for the Masses was listed by Slant Magazine at number 75 on their list of "Best Albums of the 1980s". The album was also included in the book 1001 Albums You Must Hear Before You Die.

Track listing

 On the CD, there is a 20-second pause in between "Pimpf" and "Interlude #1", followed by a 30-second pause in between "Interlude #1" and "Agent Orange".
 On some copies of the cassette the album is presented on side 1 with the four bonus tracks comprising the entirety of side 2.

2006 re-release
 Disc one is a hybrid SACD/CD with a multi-channel SACD layer.
 Disc two is a DVD containing Music for the Masses in DTS 5.1, Dolby Digital 5.1 and PCM Stereo plus bonus material

Personnel
Credits adapted from the liner notes of Music for the Masses.

Depeche Mode
 Andrew Fletcher
 Martin Gore
 Alan Wilder
 David Gahan

Technical
 Depeche Mode – production
 David Bascombe – production, engineering
 Daniel Miller – additional production, help

Artwork
 Martyn Atkins  – design, photography
 David Jones – design, photography
 Mark Higenbottam – design, photography

Charts

Weekly charts

Year-end charts

Certifications

References

External links

 Album information from the official Depeche Mode website
 Official remaster info

1987 albums
Albums produced by Daniel Miller (music producer)
Depeche Mode albums
Mute Records albums
Sire Records albums